Orgoglio  (Pride) is an Italian television series which ran from 2004 to 2006.

See also
List of Italian television series

External links
 

Italian television series
2004 Italian television series debuts
2006 Italian television series endings
RAI original programming